A sodium-vapor lamp is a gas-discharge lamp that uses sodium in an excited state to produce light at a characteristic wavelength near 589 nm.

Two varieties of such lamps exist: low pressure and high pressure. Low-pressure sodium lamps are highly efficient electrical light sources, but their yellow light restricts applications to outdoor lighting, such as street lamps, where they are widely used. High-pressure sodium lamps emit a broader spectrum of light than the low-pressure lamps, but they still have poorer color rendering than other types of lamps. Low-pressure sodium lamps only give monochromatic yellow light and so inhibit color vision at night.

Single ended self-starting lamps are insulated with a mica disc and contained in a borosilicate glass gas discharge tube (arc tube) and a metal cap. They include the sodium-vapor lamp that is the gas-discharge lamp in street lighting.

Development
The low-pressure sodium arc discharge lamp was first made practical around 1920 owing to the development of a type of glass that could resist the corrosive effects of sodium vapor. These operated at pressures of less than 1 Pa and produced a near monochromatic light spectrum around the sodium emission lines at 589.0 and 589.56 nanometres wavelength. The yellow light produced by these limited the range of applications to those where color vision was not required.

Research into high-pressure sodium lamps occurred in both the UK and the US. Increasing the pressure of the sodium vapor broadened the sodium emission spectrum so that the light produced had more energy emitted at wavelengths above and below the 589 nm region. The quartz material used in mercury discharge lamps was corroded by high pressure sodium vapor. A laboratory demonstration of a high pressure lamp was carried out in 1959.  The development by General Electric of a sintered aluminum oxide material (with magnesium oxide added to improve light transmission) was an important step in construction of a commercial lamp. The material was available in the form of tubing by 1962, but additional techniques  were required to seal the tubes and add the necessary electrodes—the material could not be fused like quartz. The end caps of the arc tube would get as hot as 800 degrees C in operation, then cool to room temperature when the lamp was turned off, so the electrode terminations and arc tube seal had to tolerate repeated temperature cycles. This problem was solved by Michael Arendash at the GE Nela Park plant. The first commercial high-pressure sodium lamps were available in 1965 from companies in the United States, the United Kingdom, and the Netherlands; at introduction a 400 watt lamp would produce around 100 lumens per watt.

Single-crystal artificial sapphire tubes were also manufactured and used for HPS lamps in the early 1970s, with a slight improvement in efficacy, but production costs were higher than for polycrystalline alumina tubes.

Low-pressure sodium 

Low-pressure sodium (LPS) lamps have a borosilicate glass gas discharge tube (arc tube) containing solid sodium and a small amount of neon and argon gas in a Penning mixture to start the gas discharge. The discharge tube may be linear (SLI lamp) or U-shaped. When the lamp is first started, it emits a dim red/pink light to warm the sodium metal; within a few minutes as the sodium metal vaporizes, the emission becomes the common bright yellow. These lamps produce a virtually monochromatic light averaging a 589.3 nm wavelength (actually two dominant spectral lines very close together at 589.0 and 589.6 nm). The colors of objects illuminated by only this narrow bandwidth are difficult to distinguish.

LPS lamps have an outer glass vacuum envelope around the inner discharge tube for thermal insulation, which improves their efficiency. Earlier LPS lamps had a detachable dewar jacket (SO lamps). Lamps with a permanent vacuum envelope (SOI lamps) were developed to improve thermal insulation. Further improvement was attained by coating the glass envelope with an infrared reflecting layer of indium tin oxide, resulting in SOX lamps.

LPS lamps are among the most efficient electrical light sources when measured in photopic lighting conditions, producing above 100 and up to 206 lm/W. This high efficiency is partly due to the light emitted being at a wavelength near the peak sensitivity of the human eye.  They are used mainly for outdoor lighting (such as street lights and security lighting) where faithful color rendition is not important. Recent studies show that under typical nighttime mesopic driving conditions, whiter light can provide better results at a lower level of illumination.

LPS lamps are similar to fluorescent lamps in that they are a low-intensity light source with a linear lamp shape. They do not exhibit a bright arc as do High-intensity discharge (HID) lamps; they emit a softer luminous glow, resulting in less glare. Unlike HID lamps, during a voltage dip low-pressure sodium lamps return to full brightness rapidly. LPS lamps are available with power ratings from 10 to 180 W; longer lamp lengths can, however, suffer design and engineering problems.

Modern LPS lamps have a service life of about 18,000 hours and do not decline in lumen output with age, though they do increase in energy consumption by about 10% towards end of life. This property contrasts with mercury vapor HID lamps, which become dimmer towards the end of life to the point of being ineffective, while consuming undiminished electrical power.

In 2017 Philips Lighting, the last manufacturer of LPS lamps, announced they were discontinuing production of the lamps due to falling demand. Initially, production was due to be phased out in the course of 2020, but this date was brought forward and the last lamps were produced at the Hamilton factory on December31, 2019.

Light pollution considerations
For locations where light pollution is a consideration, such as near astronomical observatories or sea turtle nesting beaches, low-pressure sodium is preferred (as formerly in San Jose and Flagstaff, Arizona).  Such lamps emit light on just two dominant spectral lines (with other much weaker lines), and therefore have the least spectral interference with astronomical observation. (Now that production of LPS lamps has ceased, consideration is being given into the use of narrow-band amber LEDs, which are on a similar color spectrum to LPS.) The yellow color of low-pressure sodium lamps also leads to the least visual sky glow, due primarily to the Purkinje shift of dark-adapted human vision, causing the eye to be relatively insensitive to the yellow light scattered at low luminance levels in the clear atmosphere. One consequence of widespread public lighting is that on cloudy nights, cities with enough lighting are illuminated by light reflected off the clouds. Where sodium vapor lights are the source of urban illumination, the night sky is tinged with orange.

Film special effects
Sodium vapor process (occasionally referred to as yellowscreen) is a film technique that relies on narrowband characteristics of LPS lamp. Color negative film is typically not sensitive to the yellow light from an LPS lamp, but special black-and-white film is able to record it. Using a special camera, scenes are recorded on two spools simultaneously, one with actors (or other foreground objects) and another that becomes a mask for later combination with different background. This technique originally yielded results superior to blue-screen technology, and was used in years 1956 to 1990, mostly by Disney Studios. Notable examples of films using this technique include Alfred Hitchcock's The Birds and the Disney films Mary Poppins and Bedknobs and Broomsticks. Later advancements in blue- and green-screen techniques and computer imagery closed that gap, leaving SVP economically impractical.

High-pressure sodium

High-pressure sodium (HPS) lamps have been widely used in industrial lighting, especially in large manufacturing facilities, and are commonly used as plant grow lights. They contain mercury. They have also been widely used for outdoor area lighting, such as on roadways, parking lots, and security areas. Understanding the change in human color vision sensitivity from photopic to mesopic and scotopic is essential for proper planning when designing lighting for roadways.

High-pressure sodium lamps are quite efficient—about 100 lumens per watt, when measured for photopic lighting conditions. Some higher-power lamps (e.g. 600 watt) have efficacies of about 150 lumens per watt.

Since the high-pressure sodium arc is extremely chemically reactive, the arc tube is typically made of translucent aluminum oxide. This construction led the General Electric Company to use the tradename "Lucalox" for its line of high-pressure sodium lamps.

Xenon at a low pressure is used as a "starter gas" in the HPS lamp. It has the lowest thermal conductivity and lowest ionization potential of all the stable noble gases. As a noble gas, it does not interfere with the chemical reactions occurring in the operating lamp. The low thermal conductivity minimizes thermal losses in the lamp while in the operating state, and the low ionization potential causes the breakdown voltage of the gas to be relatively low in the cold state, which allows the lamp to be easily started.

"White" high pressure sodium lamp
A variation of the high-pressure sodium introduced in 1986, the White HPS has a higher pressure than the typical HPS lamp, producing a color temperature of around 2700 kelvins with a color rendering index (CRI) of about 85, greatly resembling the color of an incandescent light.  These lamps are often used indoors in cafes and restaurants for aesthetic effect. However, white HPS lamps have higher cost, shorter service lives, and lower light efficiency, and so they cannot compete with HPS at this time.

Theory of operation 

An amalgam of metallic sodium and mercury lies at the coolest part of the lamp and provides the sodium and mercury vapor that is needed to draw an arc. The temperature of the amalgam is determined to a great extent by lamp power. The higher the lamp power, the higher will be the amalgam temperature. The higher the temperature of the amalgam, the higher will be the mercury and sodium vapor pressures in the lamp and the higher will be the terminal voltage. As the temperature rises, the constant current and increasing voltage consumes increasing energy until the operating level of power is reached. For a given voltage, there are generally three modes of operation:

 The lamp is extinguished and no current flows.
 The lamp is operating with liquid amalgam in the tube.
 The lamp is operating with all amalgam evaporated.

The first and last states are stable, because the lamp resistance is weakly related to the voltage, but the second state is unstable. Any anomalous increase in current will cause an increase in power, causing an increase in amalgam temperature, which will cause a decrease in resistance, which will cause a further increase in current. This will create a runaway effect, and the lamp will jump to the high-current state (#3). Because actual lamps are not designed to handle this much power, this would result in catastrophic failure. Similarly, an anomalous drop in current will drive the lamp to extinction. It is the second state that is the desired operating state of the lamp, because a slow loss of the amalgam over time from a reservoir will have less effect on the characteristics of the lamp than a fully evaporated amalgam. The result is an average lamp life in excess of 20,000 hours.

In practical use, the lamp is powered by an AC voltage source in series with an inductive "ballast" in order to supply a nearly constant current to the lamp, rather than a constant voltage, thus assuring stable operation. The ballast is usually inductive rather than simply being resistive to minimize energy waste from resistance losses. Because the lamp effectively extinguishes at each zero-current point in the AC cycle, the inductive ballast assists in the reignition by providing a voltage spike at the zero-current point.

The light from the lamp consists of atomic emission lines of mercury and sodium, but is dominated by the sodium D-line emission. This line is extremely pressure (resonance) broadened and is also self-reversed because of absorption in the cooler outer layers of the arc, giving the lamp its improved color rendering characteristics. In addition, the red wing of the D-line emission is further pressure broadened by the Van der Waals forces from the mercury atoms in the arc.

End of life 

At end of life, high-pressure sodium (HPS) lamps exhibit a phenomenon known as cycling, caused by a loss of sodium in the arc. Sodium is a highly reactive element and is lost in a reaction with the aluminum oxide of the arc tube. The products are sodium oxide and aluminum:

6 Na + Al2O3 → 3 Na2O + 2 Al

As a result, these lamps can be started at a relatively low voltage, but, as they heat up during operation, the internal gas pressure within the arc tube rises, and more and more voltage is required to maintain the arc discharge. As a lamp gets older, the maintaining voltage for the arc eventually rises to exceed the maximum voltage output by the electrical ballast. As the lamp heats to this point, the arc fails, and the lamp goes out. Eventually, with the arc extinguished, the lamp cools down again, the gas pressure in the arc tube is reduced, and the ballast can once again cause the arc to strike. The effect of this is that the lamp glows for a while and then goes out, typically starting at a pure or bluish white then moving to a red-orange before going out.

More sophisticated ballast designs detect cycling and give up attempting to start the lamp after a few cycles, as the repeated high-voltage ignitions needed to restart the arc reduce the lifetime of the ballast. If power is removed and reapplied, the ballast will make a new series of startup attempts.

LPS lamp failure does not result in cycling; rather, the lamp will simply not strike or will maintain the dull red glow of the start-up phase. In another failure mode, a tiny puncture of the arc tube leaks some of the sodium vapor into the outer vacuum bulb. The sodium condenses and creates a mirror on the outer glass, partially obscuring the arc tube. The lamp often continues operating normally, but much of the light generated is obscured by the sodium coating, providing no illumination.

See also 
 
  (HID)

References

Sources

External links
 Museum of Electric Discharge Lamps

Gas discharge lamps
Light pollution
Sodium
Street lighting